The 1988 Santam Bank Trophy Division B was the fourth tier of domestic South African rugby, below the two Currie Cup divisions and Division A.

Teams

Competition

Regular season and title play-offs
There were six participating teams in the Santam Bank Trophy Division B. These teams were split into two sections of either three of four teams each. Teams played the other teams in their section four times over the course of the season, twice at home and twice away. Teams received two points for a win and one points for a draw. The top team qualified for the section finals, played at the home venue of the higher-placed team, as well as the Division B finals.

Promotion play-offs
The Division B champion qualified for the promotion play-offs. That team played off against the team placed bottom in Division A over two legs. The winner over these two ties qualified for the 1989 Santam Bank Trophy Division A, while the losing team qualified for the 1989 Santam Bank Trophy Division B.

Log

Fixtures and Results

Round one

Round two

Round three

Round four

Round Five

Round Six

Round Seven

Round Eight

Round Nine

Round Ten

Final

Santam Bank Trophy Finals
The top two teams from Division A and the top two teams from Division B qualified to the Trophy finals:

Semi-finals

Final

Promotion play-offs

See also
 1988 Currie Cup Division A
 1988 Currie Cup Division B
 1988 Santam Bank Trophy Division A
 1988 Lion Cup

References

1988B
1988 Currie Cup